Coventry Kersey Dighton Patmore (23 July 1823 – 26 November 1896) was an English poet and literary critic.  He is best known for his book of poetry The Angel in the House, a narrative poem about the Victorian ideal of a happy marriage.

As a young man, Patmore worked for the British Museum in London.  After the publication of his first book of poems in 1844, he became acquainted with members of the Pre-Raphaelite Brotherhood. After the death of his first wife, his grief over her death became a major theme in his poetry. Patmore is today one of the least-known but best-regarded Victorian poets.

Life

Youth
The eldest son of author Peter George Patmore, Coventry Patmore was born at Woodford in Essex and was privately educated. The boy was very close to his father Peter and showed an early interest in literature. Coventry Patmore's first goal was to become an artist; he earned the silver palette of the Society of Arts in 1838. In 1839, his family sent Patmore to school in France for six months, where he began to write poetry. On his return to England, Peter Patmore planned to publish some of his son's youthful poems; however, Coventry Patmore had become interested in science, and set aside writing poetry.

In 1846, with help from Richard Monckton Milnes. Coventry Patmore was appointed as the printed book supernumary assistant at the British Museum.  He would hold this position for the next 19 years, while devoting his spare time to writing poetry. In 1847, Patmore married Emily Augusta Andrews, the daughter of Dr. Andrews of Camberwell.  By 1851, the couple had two sons: Coventry (born 1848) and Tennyson (born 1850). Three daughters followed – Emily (born 1853), Bertha (born 1855) and Gertrude (born 1857), before their last child, a son (Henry John), was born in 1860. Emily Andrews wrote children's stories.

Inspired by the literary success of Alfred Tennyson, Patmore devoted more energy to his writing. In  1844,  he published a small volume of Poems, which had limited commercial success. However, Patmore was more upset by a harsh review of his work in Blackwood's Magazine.  Discouraged, Patmore bought up the remainder of the edition and destroyed it.  His friends encouraged him to keep writing and gave him valuable feedback.  Furthermore, the publication of Poems enabled him to network with other literary figures, including Dante Gabriel Rossetti.  Rossetti introduced Patmore to William Holman Hunt, who brought Patmore into the Pre-Raphaelite Brotherhood, contributing his poem "The Seasons" to The Germ.

During his time at the British Museum, Patmore was instrumental in starting the Volunteer Movement in 1852. He wrote an important letter to The Times on the subject, and stirred up much enthusiasm among his colleagues. He also introduced academic David Masson to Emily Rosaline Orme, his wife Emily's niece, both of whom were strong supporters for women's suffrage and rights.

Major publications

In 1853, Patmore republished Tamerton Church Tower, the more successful of his pieces from Poems of 1844.  He also added several new poems that showed more sophistication in conception and treatment.  In 1854, Patmore published the first part of his best-known poem, The Angel in the House. The Angel in the House is a long narrative and lyric poem, with four parts published between 1854 and 1862: 

 The Betrothed (1854)
 The Espousals (1856), which eulogize his first wife; 
 Faithful for Ever (1860)
 The Victories of Love (1862)

Patmore published the four works together in 1863.  The works have come to symbolise the Victorian feminine ideal – which was not necessarily the ideal amongst feminists of the period.

By 1861 Patmore and his family was living in Elm Cottage, North End, Hampstead. On 5 July 1862 Emily Patmore died after a long illness, and shortly afterwards Patmore joined the Roman Catholic Church.

In 1864 Patmore married Marianne Byles, daughter of James Byles of Bowden Hall, Gloucester.  Patmore Buxted Hall in Surrey in 1865, which he described in How I managed my Estate (1886). In 1877 Patmore published The Unknown Eros, which some commentators believe contains his finest poetic work, and in 1878 Amelia, his own favourite among his poems, together with an essay on English Metrical Law. This departure into criticism continued in 1879 with a volume of papers entitled Principle in Art, and again in 1893 with Religio Poetae.

Patmore's second wife Marianne died in 1880, and in 1881 he married Harriet Robson from Bletchingley in Surrey (born 1840), his children's governess. Their son Francis was born in 1882.  Patmore also had a deep friendship with the poet Alice Meynell, lasting several years.  He ultimately fell in love with her, forcing Meynell to end their relationship.

In later years Patmore lived at Lymington, where he died in 1896. He was buried in Lymington churchyard.

Evaluation
A collected edition of Patmore's poems appeared in two volumes in 1886, with a characteristic preface which might serve as the author's epitaph. "I have written little", it runs; "but it is all my best; I have never spoken when I had nothing to say, nor spared time or labour to make my words true. I have respected posterity; and should there be a posterity which cares for letters, I dare to hope that it will respect me." The sincerity which underlies this statement, combined with a certain lack of humour which peers through its naïveté, points to two of the principal characteristics of Patmore's earlier poetry; characteristics which came to be almost unconsciously merged and harmonized as his style and his intention drew together into unity.

As happy love had been his earlier, the grief of loss became, in great measure, his later theme; touching and sublime thoughts upon love, death, and immortality are conveyed through strikingly poetic imagery and unusual form in the odes of The Unknown Eros, his best work. The collection is full not only of passages but entire poems in which exalted thought is expressed in poetry of the richest and most dignified melody. Spirituality informs his inspiration; the poetry is glowing and alive. The magnificent piece in praise of winter, the solemn and beautiful cadences of "Departure", and the homely but elevated pathos of "The Toys", are in their manner unsurpassed in English poetry. His somewhat reactionary political opinions, which also find expression in his odes, find less praise today although they can certainly be said to reflect, as do his essays, a serious and very active mind. Patmore is today one of the least-known but best-regarded Victorian poets.

His son Henry John Patmore (1860–83) also became a poet.

Works
 Principles in Art. London: George Bell and Sons, 1889.
 Courage in Politics and other Essays. London: Oxford University Press, 1921.

Articles
 "William Barnes, the Dorset Poet," The Library Magazine, Vol. II, November 1886/March 1887.
 “Distinction,” The Eclectic Magazine, Vol. LII, 1890
 "Three Essayettes," The Eclectic Magazine, Vol. LVI, July/December 1892.

References and sources

References

Sources

Further reading

 Betham-Edwards, Matilda (1911). "Coventry Patmore." In: Friendly Faces of Three Nationalities. London: Chapman & Hall, pp. 73–85.
 Bréguy, Katherine (1909–10). "Coventry Patmore," Part II, The Catholic World, Vols. XC/XCI, pp. 796–806, 14–27.
 Brooks, Michael (1979). "John Ruskin, Coventry Patmore, and the Nature of Gothic", Victorian Periodicals Review, Vol. XII, No. 4, pp. 130–140.
 .
 .
 Cadbury, William (1966). "The Structure of Feeling in a Poem by Patmore: Meter, Phonology, Form", Victorian Poetry, Vol. IV, No. 4, pp. 237–251.
 Champneys, Basil (1900). Memoirs and Correspondence of Coventry Patmore, Vol. II. London: George Bell & Sons.
 Crook, J. Mordaunt (1996). "Coventry Patmore and the Aesthetics of Architecture", Victorian Poetry, Vol. XXXIV, No. 4, pp. 519–543.
 Dunn, John J. (1969). "Love and Eroticism: Coventry Patmore's Mystical Imagery", Victorian Poetry, Vol. VII, No. 3, pp. 203–219.
 Edmond, Rod (1981). "Death Sequences: Patmore, Hardy, and the New Domestic Elegy", Victorian Poetry, Vol. XIX, No. 2, pp. 151–165.
 Egan, Maurice Francis (1899). "The Ode Structure of Coventry Patmore." In: Studies in Literature. St. Louis, Missouri.: B. Herder, pp. 82–108.
 Fisher, Benjamin F. (1996). "The Supernatural in Patmore's Poetry", Victorian Poetry, Vol. XXXIV, No. 4, pp. 544–557.
 Fontana, Ernest (2003). "Patmore, Pascal, and Astronomy", Victorian Poetry, Vol. XLI, No. 2, pp. 277–286.
 Forman, H. Buxton (1871). "Coventry Patmore." In: Our Living Poets: An Essay in Criticism. London: Tinsley Brothers, pp. 257–271.
 .
 .
 .
 .
 Gelpi, Barbara Charlesworth (1996). "King Cophetua and Coventry Patmore", Victorian Poetry, Vol. 34, No. 4, Coventry Patmore: 1823–1896. In Memoriam.
 .
 .
 Gwynn, Aubrey (1924). "A Daughter of Coventry Patmore", Studies: An Irish Quarterly Review, Vol. XIII, No. 51, pp. 443–456.
 Harris, Frank (1920). "Coventry Patmore." In: Contemporary Portraits. New York: Published by the author, pp. 191–210.
 Hind, C. Lewis (1922). "Coventry Patmore." In: More Authors and I. London: John Lane the Bodley Head, pp. 240–246.
 Johnson, Lionel (1911). "Coventry Patmore's Genius." In: Post Liminium: Essays and Critical Papers. London: Elkin Mathews, pp. 238–245.
 Latham, David (2012). "Coventry Patmore's Fine Line," The Journal of Pre-Raphaelite Studies, Vol. XXI, pp. 5–13.
 Leslie, Shane (1932). "Coventry Patmore." In: Studies in Sublime Failure. London: Ernest Benn, pp. 113–178.
 Lubbock, Percy (1908). "Coventry Patmore," Quarterly Review, Vol. CCVIII, pp. 356–376.
 Maynard, John (1996). "The Unknown Patmore", Victorian Poetry, Vol. XXXIV, No. 4, pp. 443–455.
 Meynell, Alice (1908). "Mr. Coventry Patmore's Odes." In: The Rhythm of Life and Other Essays. London: John Lane, the Bodley Head, pp. 89–96.
 Meynell, Alice (1922). "Coventry Patmore." In The Second Person Singular. London: Oxford University Press, pp. 94–109.
 O'Keefee, Henry E. (1920). "Coventry Patmore." In: Though and Memories. New York: The Paulist Press, pp. 30–54.
 Oliver, Edward James (1956). Coventry Patmore. New York: Sheed & Ward.
 .
 .
 Patmore, Derek (1949). The Life and Times of Coventry Patmore. London: Constable.
 Pearce, Brian Louis (1996). "Coventry Patmore (1823–1896)", RSA Journal, Vol. CXLIV, No. 5467, pp. 69–71.
 Pierson, Robert M. (1996). "Coventry Patmore's Ideas Concerning English Prosody and "The Unknown Eros" Read Accordingly", Victorian Poetry, Vol. XXXIV, No. 4, pp. 493–518.
 Roberts, Gerald (2012). "Hopkins and Patmore: Tory Politics and Poetry", History Today, Vol. LXII, No. 1, pp. 30–36.
 Reid, John Cowie (1957). The Mind and Art of Coventry Patmore London: Routledge & Paul.
 .
 Russell, Matthew (1877). "Coventry Patmore," The Irish Monthly, Vol. V, pp. 529–537.
 Symons, Arthur (1920). "Coventry Patmore," The North American Review, Vol. CCXI, No. 771, pp. 266–272.
 Tovey, Duncan (1897). "Coventry Patmore." In: Reviews and Essays in English Literature. London: George Bell & Sons, pp. 156–168.
 Weinig, Mary Anthony (1981). Coventry Patmore. Boston: Twayne Publishers.
 Woodworth, Elizabeth (2006). "Elizabeth Barrett Browning, Coventry Patmore, and Alfred Tennyson on Napoleon III: The Hero-Poet and Carlylean Heroics", Victorian Poetry, Vol. XLIV, No. 4, pp. 543–560.
 Vere, Audrey de (1889). "Coventry Patmore's Poetry." In: Essays, Chiefly Literary and Ethical. London: Macmillan & Co., pp. 126–150

External links

 
 
 Works by Coventry Patmore, at Hathi Trust
 
 Poem of the Week: The Two Deserts by Coventry Patmore
 
 Coventry Patmore Collection at John J. Burns Library, Boston College
 Portrait of Coventry Patmore in original frame by artist John Singer Sargent

1823 births
1896 deaths
Converts to Roman Catholicism
English Catholic poets
19th-century English poets
19th-century Christian mystics
English Roman Catholics
People from Woodford, London
Roman Catholic writers
Victorian poets
Roman Catholic mystics
English Swedenborgians